The John Lyman Book Awards are given annually by the North American Society for Oceanic History to recognise excellence in published books making a major contribution to the study and understanding of maritime and naval history. They are named after Professor John Lyman of the University of North Carolina.

The awards are presented in six categories:

 Canadian naval and maritime history
 U.S. naval history
 U.S. maritime history
 History of maritime science and technology
 Maritime biography and autobiography.
 Maritime reference works and published primary sources,

See also
 
 List of history awards
 List of literary awards
 List of prizes named after people

External links
 "John Lyman Book Awards" NASOH website

American literary awards
History awards
Awards established in 1995
1995 establishments in the United States